Gajetano "Gajo" Raffanelli (6 August 1913 – 7 August 1988) was a Croatian footballer who played as a midfielder and made one appearance for the Croatia national team. He later worked as a manager for Zmaj Makarska.

Career
Raffanelli earned his first and only cap for Croatia on 8 December 1940 in a friendly against Hungary. The home match, which was played in Zagreb, finished as a 1–1 draw.

Personal life
Raffanelli died on 7 August 1988 in Makarska at the age of 75.

Career statistics

International

References

External links
 

1913 births
1988 deaths
Sportspeople from Makarska
People from the Kingdom of Dalmatia
Association football midfielders
Yugoslav footballers
Croatian footballers
Croatia international footballers
HNK Zmaj Makarska players
HNK Hajduk Split players
HAŠK players
Yugoslav football managers
Association football player-managers